is a district of Nakano, Tokyo, Japan.

As of October 2020, the population of this district is 29,541. The postal code for Chūō is 164-0011.

Geography
Chūō borders Higashinakano and Nakano in the north, Kitashinjuku to the east, Honchō to the south, and Kōenji to the west.

Education
Nakano City Board of Education (中野区教育委員会) operates public elementary and junior high schools.

Schools in Chuo:
 Tōnoyama Elementary School (塔山小学校)
 Tōka Elementary School (桃花小学校)

Chuo 1-chome is zoned to Tōnoyama.  4 and 5-chome are zoned to Tōka. 3-chome is zoned to Yato Elementary School (谷戸小学校). 2-chome is divided between the zones of Tōnoyama, Tōka, Yato, and Nakano No. 1 (中野第一小学校) elementaries.

Chuo 1 and 3-chome and part of 2-chome are zoned to Nakano East Junior High School (中野東中学校).
Chuo 4 and 5-chome are zoned to Nakano Junior High School (中野中学校). Part of 2-chome is zoned to No. 2 Junior High School (第二中学校).

Private:
 Horikoshi High School

Gallery

References

Neighborhoods of Tokyo
Nakano, Tokyo